Lydia Netzer is an American novelist.

Her debut novel Shine Shine Shine was named one of the 100 Notable Books of 2012 by The New York Times. The book tells the story of a pregnant woman with alopecia, her astronaut husband, their autistic son, and her mother, who is dying from cancer. The song Shine by Carbon Leaf provided inspiration for the book's title.

Netzer's second novel, How to Tell Toledo from the Night Sky, is about a pair of astrophysicists destined (through their mothers' planning) to fall in love.

Books
Shine, Shine, Shine, St. Martin's Press, 2012
Everybody's Baby: A Novella, St. Martin's Press, 2014
How to Tell Toledo from the Night Sky, St. Martin's Press, 2014

References

External links
Lydia Netzer's website

American women novelists
Living people
Year of birth missing (living people)
Place of birth missing (living people)
21st-century American novelists
21st-century American women writers